Madison Township is one of fourteen townships in Clinton County, Indiana. As of the 2010 census, its population was 2,079 and it contained 846 housing units.  The township was named for President James Madison.

History
The first white settlers in the land that would become Madison Township were Win Winship, Jacob Stettler, Charles Poulston and James Taylor, all of whom arrived in 1829.  The first post office was at Winship's Mills with E. Winship as the first postmaster.

Geography
Prior to being settled, the land was almost completely covered in dense forest, principally oak, walnut, poplar, sugar maple, beech, ash, hickory, elm, and various other hardwood species.

Cities and towns
 Mulberry
 Hamilton

Adjacent townships
 Ross Township (northeast)
 Washington Township (southeast)
 Lauramie Township, Tippecanoe County (southwest)
 Sheffield Township, Tippecanoe County (west)
 Perry Township, Tippecanoe County (northwest)

Major highways
  Indiana State Road 38

Cemeteries
The township contains two cemeteries, Bennet and Fair Haven.

References
 United States Census Bureau cartographic boundary files
 U.S. Board on Geographic Names

Townships in Clinton County, Indiana
Townships in Indiana
1829 establishments in Indiana
Populated places established in 1829